Lucas Ruiz de Ribayaz y Fonseca (1626-after 1677) was a Spanish harpist and composer for lute and guitar.

Ruiz de Ribayaz accompanied the new Spanish viceroy on his journey to Peru in 1667, but returned to Madrid some time before the publication of a harp and guitar manual, Luz, y norte musical, para caminar por las cifras de la guitarra españióla, y arpa (Madrid, 1677). The publication was endorsed by no less than Cristóbal Galán, maestro de capilla of the Convent of Las Descalzas Reales.

References

Spanish Baroque composers
Spanish male classical composers
Spanish harpists
1626 births
Year of death unknown